T. N. Manoharan is a chartered accountant, former president of  the Institute of Chartered Accountants of India (ICAI) and Ex-chairman of Canara Bank, the fourth largest public sector bank in India.

Career 
T. N. Manoharan (TNM) hails from Rajakoil village near Gudiyatham, born to a Freedom Fighter and agriculturist T.L.Narayanasamy Chowdhry and Saradammal. He is a post graduate in commerce from Sri Venkateswara University and a Chartered Accountant of four decades of standing. He is also a law graduate from Madras Law College. He has authored books for professionals and students on Taxation. Besides carrying on his practice as a CA, he was teaching CA students with passion for about two decades in Chennai and various places in Southern India. He supported students from poor strata of society by free admission and distribution of his text books. Few thousands of his students are settled in India and Abroad. TNM was a visiting faculty in BIM in Trichy, RBI Staff Training college and SIRC of ICAI, ICMA & ICSI in Chennai during the 1990s.

He has addressed training programs at Nagpur Academy on Direct Taxes for IRS officers and for Income tax Appellate Tribunal Members at the Judicial Academy, Mumbai. He has presented several hundreds of papers in Conference and seminars and addressed renowned Institutions both in India and abroad including reputed foreign universities such as Chicago University in USA, Warwick University in UK and Southern Queensland University in Australia.

He served as a council member of the Institute of Chartered Accountants of India for 6 years from 2001 and became its National President during the year 2006-07. He was a special director of the Government nominated Board for revival of Satyam Computer Services Limited. He has written his experience as a book entitled Tech Phoenix – Satyam's 100-day Turnaround.

Manoharan served as Chairman of the committee on Accounting Standards and Taxation of Confederation of Indian Industry (CII) during 2009–2011. He was member of the various committees constituted by CVC, RBI, C&AG, CBDT and SEBI. He was on the Board of Insurance Regulatory and Development Authority (IRDA). He was a member of the Advisory Council for the skill development in BFSI Sector. He served as the Chairman of Canara Bank for five years up to August, 2020 and as the Administrator of Lakshmi Vilas Bank during 2020 till its merger with DBS Bank.

He is currently a member of the Reserve Bank of India Standing External Advisory Committee (SEAC) for evaluating applications for Universal Banks and Small Finance Banks. He is the Chairman of IDBI Bank, He is on the board of Mahindra & Mahindra, Tech Mahindra and National Bank for Financing Infrastructure and Development (NaBFID).

He was initiated into the Masonic movement in Lodge Accountants No. 194 on 27th October, 1994. He was adjudged the Best Master in the Region in 2005 in craft; Best Zerubbabel in the Region in 2013 in Chapter and Best Mark Master in the Region in 2016. He also won the best Installing officer awards in Chapter and Mark. In Craft, he was the Grand Chaplain during 2018–2019 and Assistant Grand Master during 2020–2021; In Grand Chapter, he was the Third Grand Principal during 2021-22. He was conferred the Outstanding Mason award from GLI for the year 2019 at Grand Festival held on 30th November, 2019 in Trichy. At the Grand Festival in Kolkata on 26th November, 2022, his appointment as Regional Grand Master of The Regional Grand Master of Southern India for the ensuing term of 3 years was announced.

Manoharan was presented with the “Life time achievement” award in 2005, the “For the Sake of Honour” award in 2007, the Dronacharya award in 2022 by the Rotary, the “Super Achiever Award” in 2006 by the Lions International. He received the “Business Leadership award” from the Finance Minister of India under the aegis of NDTV-Profit as part of the Satyam revival team in October, 2009 and the CNN IBN “Indian of the Year 2009” award from the Prime Minister of India in December, 2009. He was conferred the civilian honour “Padma Shri” award by the President of India on 7th April, 2010.

References

External links 
 Official webpage

Living people
1956 births
Recipients of the Padma Shri in trade and industry
Indian accountants
Tamil businesspeople
Businesspeople from Tamil Nadu
Sri Venkateswara University alumni
Indian Freemasons